Zodarion frenatum is a spider species found in Italy, Bulgaria, Greece, Crete, Corfu and Turkey.

See also 
 List of Zodariidae species

References

External links 

frenatum
Spiders of Europe
Arthropods of Turkey

Spiders described in 1885